Bianca Woolford  (born 20 July 1991)  is an Australian para-cyclist with cerebral palsy. In 2014, she won two silver medals at the UCI Para-cycling Road World Championships.

Personal
Woolford was born 20 July 1991 in Whyalla, South Australia. She has cerebral palsy, which was caused from a seizure due to asphyxiation at birth. Her parents are Tania and Michael.  She lives in Port Lincoln, South Australia.

Sports career
At the age of eighteen, she attended an Australian Paralympic Committee Talent Search day in Adelaide, South Australia. Subsequently, she attended a training day the South Australian Sports Institute (SASI) and offered a scholarship. Ben Cook was appointed her coach. Being located in Port Lincoln, she was required to travel to SASI once every two weeks for coaching. In 2013,at the  National Para-Cycling Road Championships in Echuca, Victoria, she won a gold medal in the Women's Trial Trial.
In 2014, at her first UCI Para-cycling Road World Championship in Greenville, South Carolina, she won silver medals in the Women's Time Trial T1 and Women's Road Race T1.

At the 2015 UCI Para-cycling Road World Championships, Nottwil, Switzerland, she finished fourth in the Women's Time Trial T1 and Women's Road Race T1.

Recognition
2014 - South Australian Institute of Sport Female Athlete with a Disability of the Year.

References

Paralympic cyclists of Australia
Cyclists with cerebral palsy
People from Whyalla
Sportswomen from South Australia
1991 births
Living people
Cyclists from South Australia
Australian female cyclists
South Australian Sports Institute alumni